William Bunn may refer to:

William M. Bunn (1842–1923), American newspaperman and governor of Idaho Territory
William E. L. Bunn, American artist
Willie Bunn (born 1917), American baseball player